Castle Eaton Bridge is a road bridge across the River Thames in England at Castle Eaton in Wiltshire. It carries a minor road between Cricklade, 4 miles to the southwest, and Kempsford 1 miles to the east.

The iron girder bridge with brick piers was built in 1893 with materials supplied by iron founders E Finch & Sons of Chepstow. It was described by Fred Thacker in 1920 "The present deplorable iron trough ...  The Conservancy is often blamed for its hideousness;  their responsibility amounts only to acquiescence;  I understand the Swindon District Board was the actual artist". It was strengthened in 2001.

The bridge it replaced was of timber with stone piers and stone causeway.

See also
Crossings of the River Thames

References

Castle Eaton Conservation Area

Bridges across the River Thames
Road bridges in England
Bridges in Wiltshire